The Black Mountain Invitational was a golf tournament on the Swedish Golf Tour played at the Black Mountain Golf Club in Hua Hin, Thailand, between 2013 and 2016.

A pre-season limited field-event, it featured the top 20 players from the previous season's Swedish Golf Tour Order of Merit and a further six invitees. It was not part of the Nordic Golf League.

Winners

References

Swedish Golf Tour events
Golf tournaments in Thailand